Hemmatabad (also Romanized as Hemmatābād; also known as Hemmatābād-e Kamīn) is a village in Kamin Rural District, in the Central District of Pasargad County, Fars Province, Iran. At the 2006 census, its population was 347, in 85 families.

References 

Populated places in Pasargad County